Elfwood was a popular web-based alternative art gallery and online community devoted to original science fiction and fantasy art and writing. It was started 1 May 1996 by  Thomas Abrahamsson and claimed to be the largest science fiction and fantasy art site in the world. Gradually overwhelmed by its competitor DeviantArt, Elfwood was eventually shut down some time in 2016.

History

Early years
Elfwood was founded on May 1, 1996, by Thomas Abrahamsson, under the name of the "Lothlorien" project and was aimed at amateur high-fantasy artists. The site was hosted by the academic computer club Lysator of Linköping University in Sweden.  At the time, its gallery consisted of three artists (including Abrahamsson), and all submissions and updates to the site were managed directly by Abrahamsson, with the individual users e-mailing Abrahamsson with their requested submissions or changes.

As the Lothlorien membership and gallery expanded, Abrahamsson developed the site's extranet in August 1997, allowing Elfwood members to manage their own individual art galleries and account information directly, without requiring webmaster assistance.

After a while, "Zone 47" was created for science fiction and modern fantasy art, and two years later the "Wyvern's Library" was created for written science fiction and fantasy submissions. A few months later, FARP (Fantasy Art Resource Project) was created.

In April 2000 the ERB (Elfwood Review Board) was founded; it is responsible for maintaining the rules on Elfwood.

Temporary closing
In June 2001, Elfwood was closed due to death threats and reopened a month later. In July the FanQuarter area was opened. At the end of 2001 changes to Elfwood were put on hold so a more manageable system could be created. Elfwood was reopened in February 2002 with a new moderating system. After that, every update has had to go through the Elfwood moderators.  Along with the new moderating system came Mod's Choice awards.  These awards are designated by a star on the thumbnail and an icon of a phoenix feather on the page of the artwork.  Each day's Mod's Choice awards can be found on the Elfwood homepage.

In January 2004 the sections known as Zone 47 and Lothlorien followed suit with the Wyvern's Library, merging to create the current SF&F Art area. Along with the change came a new layout for the whole site, as well as revisions to the rules. In November of that year, Elfwood artist Paul Cameron Bennett was charged in League City, Texas for kidnapping a 14-year-old girl, Margaret “Katy” Catherine Wilkerson, whom he met through a chat-room linked through Elfwood.

Elfwood had a major crash, dubbed "the infamous April Fool's Day Elfwood crash," on the first of April in 2005. All data was lost and the last backup was from February. The site came back with a timewarp to February and the rules were again revised and rewritten. Archived copies of the Elfwood statistics counter from the Wayback Machine show 8000 fewer images and 200 fewer stories between the 1st and 10 April 2005.

Elfwood celebrated its 10th anniversary in May 2006, and to commemorate this anniversary, the Opus Fantasy Arts Festival held the very first Elfwood summit in conjunction with the festival.  A guest writer and guest artist was featured at the summit.

Commercialization and afterwards
After 11 years as an amateur website, Elfwood was transformed into a commercial community in September 2007, adding new features for creating user profiles also for visiting users, tagging of favorite members and works and much more. Founder Thomas Abrahamsson said, "Cost for hosting and servers had become too high to handle as a hobby project." With this came the move of the servers from Linköping University. Before the move, Abrahamsson was frequently physically unable to access the servers to maintain the site due to their former location at the university grounds, which were locked down during the holidays.

In April 2009, Elfwood was re-launched in a new look and feel, with several important improvements at the site.

In May 2009, Elfwood launched a completely revised set of simplified rules, accepting a much wider range of works and even out-of-genre items under a special 'Other Works' tab. The Extranet was taken down its functions fully transferred to the main site, replaced by a more user friendly upload interface and simpler moderation process.

Site content
Each piece was reviewed by moderators before being displayed in a gallery, and profanity and provocative language were not allowed. As of August 31, 2005 the rules were simplified, and in May 2009 they were further streamlined allowing also Non-Genre contents under a new "Other Works" tab.

Artistic Display Areas
Elfwood had three main display areas for creative work:

 SciFi & Fantasy Art is the main section (it was formerly divided in two sections, "Lothlorien" for high fantasy art and "Zone 47" for science fiction and modern/futuristic fantasy art).
 Wyvern's Library is for sci-fi and fantasy themed stories and poetry, including short stories as well as longer novels broken up by chapters.
 FanQuarter is devoted to fan art based on sci-fi or fantasy themed visual media such as video games, movies, animated cartoons or TV shows.

As of August 16, 2010, there were 941 separate galleries in SciFi & Fantasy Art and 148 galleries in FanQuarter.

Woodworks
The Elfwood ezine Woodworks was started in January 2002 by Georgette Tan, which featured articles, reviews, artwork and tutorials by Elfwood members. Tan later retired as Editor and Megan Larson took the position, leading Woodworks to its final issue in December 2004. It is now hosted in an inactive state at the main Elfwood site after the domain was finally shut down in late 2006.

Statistics
In 2003, Elfwood had 6700 artists and 1300 writers. It logged 14500 sessions per day, each averaging 35 minutes in length. Sixty percent of the users were in the USA and most of the rest in Canada and Europe.

The Elfwood claims that it currently gets around 3,500,000 pageviews a day and around 3,000,000 million unique IP numbers (visitors) every month. In December 2006, these numbers were around 80000 daily unique visitors and around 2000000 web pages daily.

Reception
Elfwood has been praised as an outlet for alternative beliefs. The community has been described as a "very interactive place where people are very supportive," in a quote from the San Jose Mercury News.

The FARP section of the site has been frequently recommended as a free resource for tutorials in a wide variety of creative topics. For example, TeachEngineering.org cited two of FARP's tutorials as "excellent guides" for figure drawing and writing about action, Figure Drawing: Basic Pose and Construction by William Li and Writing Action by S. B. "Kinko" Hulsey.

Notable artists
The following are some notable artists from all over the world who contributed to Elfwood at some point in time:

Alena Lazareva — is a Russian digital artist who specializes in digital painting.
Natalia Pierandrei — better known as "Nati", is an Italian traditional illustrator.
Andreas Rocha — is a Portuguese 2D digital illustrator and 3D architectural designer.
Eli Yudin — is an American stand-up comedian and podcaster.

References

External links
 Lothlorien announcement at Wired.com
 Thomas Abrahamsson Homepage

Image-sharing websites
Virtual art museums and galleries
Internet properties established in 1996
Internet properties disestablished in 2017
Swedish social networking websites
Art websites